Inc. is an American business magazine founded in 1979 and based in New York City. The magazine publishes six issues per year, along with surrounding online and social media content. The magazine also produces several live and virtual events yearly.

Published by Mansueto Ventures, Inc. is best known for its annual rankings of the fastest-growing privately held companies in the United States, called the "Inc. 500" and "Inc. 5000."

History
Inc. was founded in Boston by Bernie Goldhirsh, and its first issue appeared in April 1979. Goldhirsh was an MIT-trained mechanical engineer who founded Sail magazine, which he sold for $10 million in 1980. Paul W. Kellam, who had joined Goldhirsh's company as editor of Marine Business, was one of Inc. first editors. Goldhirsh kept a low profile, and George Gendron, who served as editor-in-chief from 1980 to 2002, was considered the "public face" of the magazine. In 2000, Goldhirsh sold the magazine to German publishing house Gruner + Jahr for a reported price of over $200 million. In 2005, Joe Mansueto, founder of investment research firm Morningstar Ventures, bought Inc. and another business title, Fast Company, for about $35 million, forming publishing company Mansueto Ventures. 

Inc. office is at 7 World Trade Center in New York City. In December 2013, Eric Schurenberg was appointed president and editor-in-chief of Inc., replacing the long-tenured Bob LaPointe. In March 2018, Schurenberg was appointed CEO of Mansueto Ventures and Ledbetter was promoted to editor-in-chief of Inc.

Its current editor-in-chief is Scott Omelianuk, former editor-in-chief of This Old House magazine. He succeeded James Ledbetter in early 2020.

In October 1981, Inc. became the first magazine to feature Steve Jobs on its cover, alongside the proclamation, "This man has changed business forever."

Inc. publishes books under the imprint An Inc. Original in partnership with Greenleaf Book Group. The books are written by business experts and cater to an audience of entrepreneurs. 

Inc. produces a weekly, award-winning podcast called Inc. Uncensored, where Inc. journalists discuss startups, technology, market and industry trends, and more. The podcast has released hundreds of episodes, and won the 2016 and 2017 min's Best of the Web Awards for Best Podcast, along with a 2018 Folio: Eddie & Ozzie Award honorable mention.

Inc. received multiple Folio awards in 2017 and 2018, including honors for full-print issues, best redesign, use of video, and use of social media. Its 2016 feature "The Stealthy Sales Kings of Amazon" won a Best in Business award from the Society for Advancing Business Writing and Editing.

See also
 Inc. India

References

External links
 
 "Inc 500 Fastest Growing Companies in America List"
 "The Stealthy Sales Kings of Amazon"

1979 establishments in the United States
Business magazines published in the United States
Eight times annually magazines published in the United States
Business conferences
Magazines established in 1979
Magazines published in Boston
Magazines published in New York City
Small business